Eclipta prostrata, commonly known as false daisy, yerba de tago, Gunta kalagaraku/Gunta galagaraku, Karisalankanni, and bhringraj, is a species of plant in the family Asteraceae. It is widespread across much of the world.

This plant has cylindrical, grayish roots. Solid, circular, purplish stems with white fine hairs 0.8m. Leaves arranged in opposite pairs, hairy in two-sided, lanceolate, serrated 2–12.5 cm long, 5-35 mm wide.
The bumpy achenes are compressed and narrowly winged. 
 
This species grows commonly in moist places in warm temperate to tropical areas worldwide. It is widely distributed throughout India, Nepal, China, Thailand, and Brazil.

Traditional uses 

The plant has traditional uses in Ayurveda. In India, it is known as bhangra or bhringaraj. Wedelia calendulacea is known by the same names, so the white-flowered E. alba is called white bhangra and the yellow-flowered W. calendulacea is called yellow bhangra.

In Southeast Asia, the dried whole plant is used in traditional medicine, although there is no high-quality clinical research to indicate such uses are effective. The Balinese cook it as a vegetable, the Javanese consume this herb (orang-aring or urang-aring) as part of their lalap, they also infuse it with coconut oil as a kind of hair oil popular until the 1970s Its leaves are extracted as a black hair dye, and in tattooing.

Phytochemistry
Eclipta prostrata contains various phytochemicals, such as coumestans, polypeptides, polyacetylenes, thiophene derivatives, steroids, sterols, triterpenes, and flavonoids.

References

Further reading

External links

	
Jepson Manual Treatment, University of California
United States Department of Agriculture Plants Profile

Heliantheae
Flora of North America
Flora of South America
Flora of Europe
Flora of Asia
Plants described in 1753
Taxa named by Carl Linnaeus
Plants used in Ayurveda